HD 42540, also known as HR 2196, is a suspected variable star in the constellation Pictor. A class K2-3III orange giant, its apparent magnitude is 5.04 and it is approximately 362 light years away based on parallax.

References

Pictor (constellation)
K-type giants
CD-62 235
028991
2196
042540
Suspected variables